Else Marie Tveit Rødby (born 26 May 1982) is a Norwegian politician.

She was elected representative to the Storting from the constituency of Akershus for the period 2021–2025, for the Centre Party.

Rødby graduated in jurisprudence from the University of Oslo, and is also a farmer.

References

1982 births
Living people
People from Hurum
University of Oslo alumni
Akershus politicians
Centre Party (Norway) politicians
Members of the Storting
21st-century Norwegian politicians